Maba District is a district in East Halmahera Regency, North Maluku, Indonesia. It is the capital of the East Halmahera Regency.

Buli, formerly Boeli is a town in Maba District. Most of the people in Buli are Christian and about a third of the population is Muslim.

See also
Buli Airport

References

Populated places in North Maluku
Regency seats of North Maluku